This is a list of words in the English language that originated in the languages of India.

Hindi or Urdu
 see: List of English words of Hindi or Urdu origin

Kannada
 see: List of English words of Kannada origin

Malayalam
 see: List of English words of Malayalam origin

Sanskrit
 see: List of English words of Sanskrit origin

Tamil
 see: List of English words of Tamil origin

Telugu
 see: List of English words of Telugu origin

Other languages
 Adda, from Bengali, a group of people
 Bhut jolokia, from Assamese (ভূত জলকীয়া Bhut Zôlôkiya), a hot chili found in Assam and other parts of Northeast India
 Jute from Bengali, a fiber

Marathi
 Doolally, from Marathi word देवळाली. "mad, insane" from the town of Deolali
 Mongoose, from Marathi word मुंगूस (Muṅgūsa)

External links
Etymology of Selected Words of Indian Language Origin  in Colonial & Postcolonial Literary Dialogues

India